is the sixth full-length album by Japanese novelty heavy metal band Animetal, released through VAP on September 22, 2004. The album consists of a non-stop marathon of metal covers of anime ending themes; mainly from the Super Robot series. Some songs were previously recorded as the band's 1997 single Sentimetal.

The album cover by Ken Ishikawa depicts the band trio as Getter Robo-like robots.

Track listing 
All tracks are arranged by Animetal.

Personnel
 - Lead vocals
Syu - Guitar
Masaki - Bass

with

Katsuji - Drums

Footnotes

References

External links

2004 albums
Animetal albums
Japanese-language albums
Covers albums